Petre Hristovici (born 22 May 1938) is a Romanian bobsledder. He competed in the four-man event at the 1968 Winter Olympics.

References

1938 births
Living people
Romanian male bobsledders
Olympic bobsledders of Romania
Bobsledders at the 1968 Winter Olympics
Sportspeople from Bucharest